The Sumsky Skerries (Sumskiye Shkhery) are an extensive cluster of islands, islets and shoals in the White Sea. They are located in the Onega Bay, close to its southern shore.

The largest islands of these skerries are: Sosnovtsy, Bolshoy Varbostrov, Malyy Varbostrov, Berezovets, Raydostrov, Ugmorin and Kondostrov.

This island group belongs to the Republic of Karelia administrative division of the Russian Federation.

References
Location
Geographic data

See also
Birdlife
Mokhova О.Н., Malygin S.B., RESULTS OF RESEARCH OF FUCALES SEAWEED VEGETATION IN THE WHITE SEA`S SUMSKY SKERRIES ISLANDS; Northern Branch PINRO, Arkhangelsk.

Archipelagoes of the Arctic Ocean
Archipelagoes of Russia
Landforms of the White Sea
Karelia
Skerries
Landforms of the Republic of Karelia